Alejandro Gastón Aravena Mori (born 22 June 1967) is a Chilean architect and executive director of the firm Elemental S.A.  He won the Pritzker Architecture Prize in 2016, and was the director and curator of the Architecture Section of the 2016 Venice Biennale.

Education and career
Aravena graduated from the Pontifical Catholic University of Chile in 1992, He continued his studies of Theory and Art History in Università Iuav di Venezia in Venice, Italy (1992–1993) and established Alejandro Aravena Architects in 1994. Aravena was a visiting professor at Harvard Graduate School of Design from 2000 to 2005, and is the Elemental-Copec Professor at Universidad Católica de Chile. Aravena co-authored Los Hechos de la Arquitectura (ARQ, 1999), El Lugar de la Arquitectura (ARQ, 2002) and the monograph Elemental: Incremental Housing and Participatory Design Manual (Hatje-Cantz, 2012). He was a member of the Pritzker Prize Jury from 2009 to 2015, and is an International Fellow of the Royal Institute of British Architects.

In 2006, he became the executive director of ELEMENTAL, a for profit company with social interest.

In July 2015, Aravena was named Director of the Architecture Section of the Venice Biennale, with the responsibility for curating the 15th International Architecture Exhibition held in Venice in 2016, with the theme "REPORTING FROM THE FRONT." In his curation of the 15th Venice Biennale of Architecture, Aravena foregrounded social housing, incremental housing, rural-urban relationships, the balance between technology and natural materials, and an attentiveness to manual labor and handicraft. Aravena invited Raphael Zuber, Herzog & de Meuron, Tadao Ando, Peter Zumthor, David Chipperfield, SANAA and Francis Kéré, among others.

Works

Aravena designed the "Siamese Towers," a workshop building at the school of architecture and faculty buildings at the Pontifical Catholic University of Chile. He designed the Colegio Huelquén Montessori; the Casa para una Escultora (House for a Sculptor); the Casa en el lago Pirehueico (House on Pirihueico Lake); Hunt, Le Mans and Johnson residential halls of St. Edward’s University in Austin, Texas; art workshops on the Vitra campus at Weil am Rhein; Villa in Ordos (Inner Mongolia) and projects for the Elemental initiative. He also designed a children's playground at the Metropolitan Park of Santiago.

Awards
Aravena won the Silver Lion prize at the XI Biennale in Venice, the Erich Schelling Architecture Medal in 2006, and was a finalist for the Mies van der Rohe Award (2000) and the Iakhov Chernikhov Prize (2008). He received a Global Award for Sustainable Architecture in 2008. He was a 2011 Index award winner and won a Holcim Awards Silver for Sustainable Construction (region Latin America). Exhibitions of his work have included a showing at Harvard Graduate School of Design in 2004, the São Paulo Biennale in 2007, the Triennale di Milano in 2008, and the Venice Biennale of Architecture in 2008 and MoMA, New York in 2010.

In 2016, he was awarded the Pritzker Architecture Prize — the most prestigious recognition to architects. From 2009 to 2015, he was a member of the Pritzker Architecture Prize jury.

References

External links

 Alejandro Aravena website
 
 Alejandro Aravena - Board member of the LafargeHolcim Foundation
Alejandro Aravena - ArchDaily Spotlight
Solving the Housing Crisis Half-a-House at a Time: Incremental Housing as a Means to Fulfilling the Human Right to Housing (U. Miami Inter-Am. L. Rev. 2021) - Law Review article reviewing legal implementation of incremental housing in Chile and the United States

Chilean architects
People from Santiago
1967 births
Living people
Pontifical Catholic University of Chile alumni
Pritzker Architecture Prize winners
Recycled art artists